The Aryan Nations was a North American antisemitic, neo-Nazi, white supremacist hate group that was originally based in Kootenai County, Idaho, about  miles (4.4 km) north of the city of Hayden Lake. Richard Girnt Butler founded the Aryan Nations in the 1970s.

In 2001, the Federal Bureau of Investigation (FBI) classified the Aryan Nations as a "terrorist threat." In a review of terrorist organizations, the RAND Corporation  called it the "first truly nationwide terrorist network" in the United States and Canada.

History

The beliefs of the Aryan Nations are based on the teachings of Wesley A. Swift, a leading figure in the early Christian Identity movement. Swift combined British Israelism, extreme antisemitism, and political militancy. He founded his own church in California in the mid-1940s. He hosted a daily radio broadcast in California during the 1950s and 1960s. In 1957, the name of his church was changed to the Church of Jesus Christ–Christian, a name which continues to be used by Aryan Nations churches.

From 1974 until 2001, the headquarters of the Aryan Nations was located in a 20-acre (8.1 ha) compound 1.8 miles (3 km) north of Hayden, Idaho. The Aryan Nations had a number of state chapters, but it was highly decentralized and the chapters' ties to the organization's headquarters were extremely loose. The group hosted an annual World Congress of Aryan Nations at Hayden Lake for Aryan Nations members and members of similar groups.

Until 1998, the leadership of the Aryan Nations remained firmly in the hands of Richard Girnt Butler. By that time, he was over 80 years old and his health was poor. At the annual Aryan Nations World Congress in 2001, Neuman Britton was appointed to lead the Aryan Nations as Butler's successor. But in August 2001, after Britton died, Butler appointed Harold Ray Redfeairn who was from Ohio to lead the Aryan Nations as his successor; he had been agitating for control of the organization since the mid-1990s. Redfeairn had brought in Dave Hall, an FBI informant who exposed the group's illegal activities. After this was discovered, Redfeairn was distrusted by some in the group. Redfeairn and August Kreis III, the propaganda minister for Aryan Nations, formed a splinter group, and Butler expelled them from Aryan Nations.

A few months later, Redfeairn returned to form an alliance with Butler. Butler's 2002 World Congress drew fewer than 100 people, and when he ran for mayor, he lost, garnering only 50 votes against more than 2,100 votes. Redfeairn died in October 2003, and Butler died of heart failure in September 2004. At the time of Butler's death, Aryan Nations had about 200 actively participating members.

Shooting and lawsuit

In September 2000, the Southern Poverty Law Center (SPLC) won a $6.3 million judgment against Aryan Nations from an Idaho jury, who awarded punitive and compensatory damages to plaintiffs Victoria Keenan and her son Jason. The two Native Americans had been beaten with rifles by Aryan Nations security guards in Coeur d'Alene, Idaho in July 1998. The woman and her son were driving near the Aryan Nations compound when their car backfired, which the guards claimed to misinterpret as gunfire. The guards fired at the car, striking it several times. The car crashed and one of the Nations guards held the Keenans at gunpoint, beating them.

The SPLC filed suit on behalf of the Keenans. A jury found that Butler and Aryan Nations were grossly negligent in selecting and supervising the guards, and awarded the Keenans $6.3 million. A local attorney from Keenan's legal team said that the large verdict was partly to compensate the Keenans, but largely to punish Butler and his followers, and serve to deter similar conduct in the future.

The $6.3 million verdict caused Butler to file for bankruptcy one month later. As part of the bankruptcy process, the group's property was put up for auction. SPLC loaned the Keenans $95,000 to bid on the 20-acre property. In February 2001, the group's Hayden Lake compound and intellectual property, including the names "Aryan Nations" and "Church of Jesus Christ Christian", were transferred to the Keenans. Idaho native and millionaire philanthropist Greg Carr purchased the property from the Keenans, donating it to the North Idaho College Foundation. It has been converted to a park dedicated to peace.

Local fire departments demolished some of the church's former buildings by burning them during training exercises. Edgar Steele, the attorney who had represented Butler, was later convicted of hiring a handyman to kill his own wife. In 2014, Steele died while serving a 50-year prison sentence.

Split and decline
There were three main Aryan Nations factions. One was led by Charles John Juba, followed by August Kreis III. In 2012, Kreis stepped down as leader and designated Drew Bostwick as his successor. In 2002, Juba's group was based on a  compound in the rural town of Ulysses in Potter County, north central Pennsylvania; it hosted the 2002 Aryan Nations World Congress. Juba resigned in March 2005, announcing that Kreis was the group's new leader.

Kreis established a new headquarters in Lexington, South Carolina, and he eventually moved it close to Union City, Tennessee. In 2005, Kreis received media attention because he attempted to form an Aryan Nations–al Qaeda alliance.

In 2005, the Holy Order of the Phineas Priesthood, previously in association with the faction which was led by Kreis, seceded and formed Aryan Nations Revival, based in New York City. The Holy Order was created in opposition to Kreis's acceptance of adherents of Wicca, Islam, and Odinism. It considered such groups to be a deviation from the core Christian Identity belief of Aryan Nations. This Revival rapidly became the largest faction.

In the Congressional Record, the leaders of Aryan Nations Revival were listed as domestic terrorists. The government concluded that the Holy Order of the Brotherhood of the Phineas Priesthood was the enforcement/terrorist wing of Aryan Nations. Aryan Nations Revival hosted a weekly radio broadcast which it titled The Aryan Nations Broadcast. Airing from 1979 to 2009, the radio program was authorized by Richard Butler. The program ended when host Hal Turner was arrested for threatening the lives of federal judges in Chicago. While incarcerated, Turner announced, through his attorney, that he was a federal informant, and that Aryan Nations was among those organizations which had been informed upon.

In 2009, Aryan Nations Revival, which was then based in Texas, merged with Pastor Jerald O'Brien's Aryan Nations, which was based in Coeur d'Alene, Idaho. Both parties ardently adhered to Christian Identity.

Symbols

The emblem (or shield) of the Aryan Nations is designed to reflect aspects of British Israelism.

Associates
In 1983, Robert Jay Mathews, who had visited the Aryan Nations compound many times, formed The Order, along with Aryan Nations members Dan Bauer, Randy Duey, Denver Parmenter, and Bruce Pierce. The Order's mission was to overthrow the Zionist Occupational Government and establish the Northwest Territorial Imperative through an orchestrated plot to commit acts of domestic terrorism, which would include murder, arson, armed robbery, theft, counterfeiting, and extortion between 1983 and 1984. Dennis McGiffen, who also had ties to Aryan Nations, formed a group called "The New Order", inspired by Mathews' group. The members were arrested before they could follow through with their violent plans.

Buford O. Furrow, Jr., who was convicted of both the Los Angeles Jewish Community Center shooting and the murder of Filipino American postal worker Joseph Ileto, had previously worked as a security guard at the Aryan Nations compound for some time.

On April 4, 2004, intending to start a "Race War", Sean Michael Gillespie (former member of Aryan Nations) threw a Molotov cocktail at B'nai Temple Israel in the city of Oklahoma, Oklahoma. There were no casualties, but the building sustained material damage. Gillespie was arrested in Little Rock, Arkansas, on April 16 of the same year, but it was not until August 2005 that he was sentenced to 39 years in prison for attacking the Jewish temple and then trying to send a racist letter to the congregation. The defendant raised his hand in a Nazi salute with stiff arms as the judge left the courtroom.

See also

 Antisemitism in Canada
 Antisemitism in Christianity
 Antisemitism in the United States
 Aryan Brotherhood
 Aryan Brotherhood of Texas
 Aryan Circle
 Aryan race
 Aryan Republican Army
 Assembly of Christian Soldiers
 British Israelism
 Christian Defense League
 Christian fascism
 Christian Identity
 Christian nationalism
 Christian Nationalist Crusade
 Christianity and violence
 Christian terrorism
 Church of Israel
 Church of Jesus Christ–Christian
 Clerical fascism
 The Covenant, the Sword, and the Arm of the Lord
 Creativity
 Cult
 Elohim City, Oklahoma
 Esoteric Nazism#Collective Aryan unconscious
 Far-right politics
 Far-right subcultures
 Fascism
 Fascism in Canada
 Fascism in North America
 The Foundations of the Nineteenth Century
 French Israelism
 German Christians (movement)
 Groups claiming affiliation with Israelites
 Hate group
 Identitarian movement
 Kinism
 Kingdom Identity Ministries
 Ku Klux Klan
 LaPorte Church of Christ
 List of Christian denominations#Christian Identitist
 List of Christian movements#Religious
 List of fascist movements
 List of Ku Klux Klan organizations
 List of neo-Nazi organizations
 List of organizations designated by the Southern Poverty Law Center as hate groups
 List of white nationalist organizations
 Master race
 Nazism
 Neo-Confederates
 Neo-fascism
 Neo-Nazism
 Nordicism
 On the Edge: Political Cults Right and Left
 Phineas Priesthood
 Positive Christianity
 Posse Comitatus (organization)
 Protestant Reich Church
 Race and appearance of Jesus
 Racism in the United States
 Radical right (United States)
 Religious antisemitism
 Religious terrorism
 Right-wing terrorism
 Robert E. Miles
 Silver Legion of America
 The Shepherd's Chapel
 Terrorism in the United States
 Domestic terrorism in the United States
 White nationalism
 White supremacy
 Wotansvolk

References

External links
 Official website
 Poisoning the Web: Hatred Online—ADL article
 Keenan vs Aryan Nations—summary of a lawsuit against the Aryan Nations for its violent activities.
 SPLC Hate Group Map of the USA—includes Aryan Nations in "Neo-Nazi" category (archived)
 FBI file on Aryan Nations

 
British Israelism
Christian fundamentalism
Christianity and race
Christianity and violence
Groups claiming Israelite descent
Late modern Christian antisemitism
Neo-Nazi organizations in the United States
Nordicism
Politics and race
Prejudice and discrimination by type
Pseudohistory
Terrorism in the United States
White-supremacist organized crime groups in the United States
1970s establishments in Idaho